Tombel is a town and commune in the Southwest Region of Cameroon, in the north of the Mungo Valley. 
The town is traditionally part of the Bakossi people's country, but now has a significant population of other tribes from other regions of Cameroon.

In the late 1966 tension between some Bakossi indigenes and some Bamilekes resulted in an outbreak of violence. This outbreak was the remnants of the Union of the Peoples of Cameroon's political movement.  Losses were counted on both sides, mostly from the Bamilekes with 236 settlers dead. The Bakossi indigenes argued that some Bamilekes were forcing a political course that threatened the integrity of the Bakossi land and people. In response, the army moved in, rounded up all able-bodied Bakossi men in the Tombel area and placed them in detention camps, where many were severely tortured to obtain confessions. Eventually 143 Bakossi men were put on trial and 17 sentenced to death, while 75 received life sentences of life imprisonment.

Lying immediately to the south of Mount Kupe, Tombel receives little direct sunshine, particularly in the rainy season, due to constant cloud cover. 
The town has suffered from persistent shortages of water supply, despite several forceful attempts by the women of the town to improve the situation.

Tombel is the largest town of Kupe Muanenguba Division. This is also the headquarters of one of the three subdivisions of Kupe Muanenguba division. From its 5 km distance from Loum to the East Littoral region and its large population of migrants from other provinces, the town enjoys an advantage in bilingualism (French and English). Tombel, is a welcoming place to people from other villages of Bakossi as well as Bamilekes from the West. The presence of other ethnique groups like Bamilekes, Bafia and Doualas is fast transforming the town into a small cosmopolitan town. Tombel is also an important road intersection to Kumba, Loum to north, west and Douala as well to other areas of the division including Bangem, the headquarters of Kupe Muanenguba division.

At the foot of Kupe Mountain, Tombel attracts visitors who seek adventure to climb the mountain, which provides excitement to tourists interested in the diversity of plants, animals and birds found in the mounenguba mist.
Between Loum in the Littoral and Tombel is a place popularly known as "customs". Customs is the place where Southern Cameroonians, prior to the 1961 plebiscite, were obliged to show their "Laissez-passer" (a kind of visa) which permitted them to cross over to independent "la république du Cameroun". 
Upon Reunification, the customs barrier was removed but the building still lies there, abandoned but still carrying the story of reunification .

The reunification road is the Loum-Tombel-Kumba road. Unfortunately this road has been abandoned and passing through it at any time of the year requires a lot of courage on the part of the driver.
Although Tombel sub division is one of the major bread baskets of the country with fertile volcanic soils, a temperate climate, highly productive cocoa and coffee farms and other cash crops, the people and the town are yet to reflect this. The bad roads have left the area enclaved, the reunification story carried by the road notwithstanding .

See also
Website dedicated to the people from Tombel
Councils of Cameroon

References

Communes of Southwest Region (Cameroon)